Meghna Venkat , is an Indian classical Bharata Natyam dancer. She is also a choreographer and teacher. She is the disciple of guru shri Adyar K. Lakshman   She has performed in many places in India. she is a regular artiste for Nada Neerajanam. She has participated in world dance day celebrations conducted by Sai arts International  She is an em-paneled artist of The Ministry of Culture, Govt of India. She is a graded artist of Doordarshan. Selected for lectureship under UGC-NET Central Government examination

Biography

Awards

 'Nritya Shiromani' 
 'Natya Chemmal' 
 Nritya Kowmudhi

References

Living people
Performers of Indian classical dance
Indian dance teachers
Indian classical choreographers
Bharatanatyam exponents
Indian female classical dancers
Indian women choreographers
Indian choreographers
Year of birth missing (living people)